The Gugang Lake is a natural lake in Jincheng Township, Kinmen County, Taiwan.

Geology
The lake is surrounded by hills and willows growing on its shore. It is the habitat for aquatic birds, especially the European hoopoes.

Features
The lake features the Gugang Pavilion which was built in 1964 by Zhuang Wu-nan from Tamsui, Taipei after ten months of construction works. The pavilion is 16 meters in height.

References

Jincheng Township
Lakes of Kinmen County